The Fort Early and Jubal Early Monument was started in the early 1900s, and consists of the remains of an American Civil War fort and monument located on a  site at Lynchburg, Virginia. Confederate forces under the command of Lt. Gen. Jubal Early constructed the roughly square earthen fort in June 1864 as part of the outer defenses of Lynchburg as the Union Army of West Virginia, under Maj. Gen. David Hunter, advanced from the north and west in an attempt to capture the city during the Battle of Lynchburg. It is the only section of the Lynchburg defenses still in existence.

Within the fort is a one-story brick structure that was built in 1922 by the Fort Hill Woman's Club and contains exhibits on the Battle of Lynchburg. The remaining portions of the breastworks are intact including a sally port in the northern wall used to bring in ammunition and other supplies during the military operation of the fort.

It was listed on the National Register of Historic Places in 2002.

Gallery

References

Monuments and memorials on the National Register of Historic Places in Virginia
Early
Neoclassical architecture in Virginia
Obelisks in the United States
Monuments and memorials in Virginia
1919 sculptures
Buildings and structures in Lynchburg, Virginia
National Register of Historic Places in Lynchburg, Virginia
Early
Granite sculptures in Virginia
Confederate States of America monuments and memorials in Virginia
Jubal A. Early